The National Archives Foundation is an independent non-profit organization that works to increase public awareness of and showcase the United States National Archives and Records Administration.

Board of Directors 
•	Chair: Governor James J. Blanchard, DLA Piper US, LLP
•	Vice Chair: Cokie Roberts, Journalist
•	Vice President: Michael R. Beschloss, Presidential Historian 
•	Vice President: Ken Burns, Florentine Films
•	Treasurer: Marvin F. Weissberg, Weissberg Foundation
•	Secretary: Marilynn Wood Hill, Author/Historian 
•	Honey Alexander, Community Leaders
•	A’Lella Bundles, Author/Journalist
•	Steven W. Caple, Unity Hunt, Inc.
•	James Cicconi, Community Leader
•	Peter Cuneo, Cuneo & Co., LLC
•	Richard Eliasberg, Prima Management Co.
•	Nancy Folger, Community Leader
•	Fruzsina Harsanyi, Consultant
•	Sharron Hunt, Unity Hunt LLC
•	Zina Kramer, Events Marketing
•	Ambassador Fay Hartog Levin, The Chicago Council on Global Affairs
•	Jon Liebman, Brillstein Entertainment 
•	Kenneth G. Lore, Katten Muchin Rosenman LLP
•	Jacqueline B. Mars, Community Leader
•	Cappy McGarr, MCM Interests, LLC
•	Mary C. Moynihan, Perkins Coie, LLP
•	Lawrence F. O’Brien, III, The OB•C Group, LLC
•	Soledad O'Brien, Starfish Media Group
•	Michael Powell, NCTA - The Internet & Television Association
•	Bruce Ramer, Gang Tyre Ramer and Brown, Inc
•	Lucinda Robb, Community Leader
•	Deborah Ratner Salzberg, Forest City Washington
•	Diana Spencer, William G. McGowan Charitable Fund
•	Ross Swimmer, Swimmer Group, LLC
•	Riley Temple, Temple Strategies
•	Marjorie B. Tiven, Global Cities, Inc.
•	Linda Davis Watters, John Hancock Services
•	David E. Weisman, InSite Wireless Group, LLC
•	Tom Wheeler, Investor
•	John H. Zentay, DLA Piper US, LLP

References

External links 
 

National Archives and Records Administration
Foundations based in Washington, D.C.